Janardhanan  or Janardanan may refer to:

 Janardhanan (actor) (born 1946), Indian Malayalam film actor
 Janardhanan Ramdas (born 1970), Indian cricketer
 Karamana Janardanan Nair (1936–2000), Indian Malayalam film actor
 Kudamaloor Janardanan, Indian flautist of the Carnatic music tradition
 Ganesh Janardhanan (stage name VTV Ganesh), Indian Tamil film actor and producer
 Babu Janardhanan, Indian Malayalam screenwriter and film director

See also
 John Jaffer Janardhanan, a 1982 Malayalam film